James Gordon Cuddy,  (born December 2, 1955) is a Canadian singer-songwriter primarily associated with the band Blue Rodeo.

Early life and education
Cuddy was born in Toronto, Ontario.  His Mother Jean Cuddy was an English teacher at Monarch Park Secondary School. He attended North Toronto Collegiate Institute, where he met and befriended Greg Keelor, his future bandmate. He also went to Upper Canada College and Queen's University.

Musical career

The Hi-Fis
After graduating from university, Cuddy and Keelor formed a band called the Hi-Fis along with Jim Sublett on drums and Malcolm Schell playing bass. The band released a single in 1980 featuring "Look What You've Done" and on the B side "I Don't Know Why (You Love Me)". The record was not a commercial success, and when they couldn't get a record deal in Toronto, they headed off to New York City. In New York they met keyboardist Bob Wiseman, but were still unable to arrange a recording contract. They later moved back to Toronto.

Blue Rodeo

In 1984 Cuddy and Keelor formed a new band, Blue Rodeo, with Wiseman, and recruited Bazil Donovan on bass and Cleave Anderson on drums as backup.  Since that time, Cuddy has continued to lead the band, which has toured extensively and released 16 studio albums.

Jim Cuddy Band
Cuddy has recorded five solo albums and performs live with the Jim Cuddy Band, featuring musicians such as Bazil Donovan, Colin Cripps, Joel Anderson, Steve O'Connor, Anne Lindsay and Gavin Brown. Guest performers on his solo albums have included Kathleen Edwards, former Weeping Tile member Sarah Harmer, and Wilco's Jeff Tweedy.

Other endeavors

Jim Cuddy's song "Whistler" from the All in Time album was featured in the 2002 documentary Ski Bums by John Zaritsky. 

In 2016, Cuddy participated in a benefit concert in Edmonton, Alberta and another in Toronto, Ontario for the citizens of Fort McMurray, whose town was destroyed by fire.

On March 19, 2020, he performed the first concert in the National Arts Centre's #CanadaPerforms series of livestreamed home concerts by Canadian musicians during the COVID-19 pandemic.

He narrates the TVOntario documentary series Striking Balance.

Awards
Cuddy won Best Male Vocalist at The 1999 JUNO Awards and Adult Alternative Album of the Year for The Light That Guides You Home at The 2007 JUNO Awards

In 2000, Cuddy and Blue Rodeo bandmate Greg Keelor were the recipients of the National Achievement Award at the annual SOCAN Awards held in Toronto.

In 2013, he was made an Officer of the Order of Canada along with Greg Keelor, "for their contributions to Canadian music and for their support of various charitable causes".

Personal life

Cuddy is married to Canadian actress Rena Polley. They have three children, their daughter Emma, and their two sons, Devin and Sam, who are also musicians. His brother Loftus Cuddy was a Conservative candidate for the riding of Toronto—Danforth in the 2004 Canadian federal election.

In the 2004 edition of Canada Reads, Cuddy advocated for Guy Vanderhaeghe's novel The Last Crossing, which won the competition. In the 2007 edition of Canada Reads, an "all-star" competition pitting the five winning advocates from previous years against each other, Cuddy returned to champion Timothy Taylor's novel Stanley Park.

In 2016, Cuddy collaborated with Tawse Winery in Niagara to launch a new wine brand, Cuddy by Tawse.

In 2017, Cuddy narrated the documentary TV series Striking Balance.

Discography

Albums

Singles

Notes
A^ "Too Many Hands" peaked at number 13 on the Canadian RPM Adult Contemporary Tracks chart and number 34 on the RPM Country Tracks chart.

Guest singles

Music videos

References

External links
JimCuddy.com – The Official Website of Jim Cuddy
BlueRodeo.com – The Official Website of Blue Rodeo
GregKeelor.com – The Official Website of Greg Keelor
 
 Entry at canadianbands.com

Canadian rock singers
Canadian country singer-songwriters
Canadian male singer-songwriters
Canadian rock guitarists
Canadian country guitarists
Canadian male guitarists
Juno Award for Adult Alternative Album of the Year winners
Living people
Musicians from Toronto
Officers of the Order of Canada
Upper Canada College alumni
1955 births
Canadian country rock musicians
Blue Rodeo members
Juno Award for Artist of the Year winners
20th-century Canadian male singers
21st-century Canadian male singers
20th-century Canadian guitarists
21st-century Canadian guitarists